Blanchard Carter (born June 3, 1955) is a former American football tackle. He played for the Tampa Bay Buccaneers in 1977.

References

1955 births
Living people
American football tackles
UNLV Rebels football players
Tampa Bay Buccaneers players